Michalis Paraskevas is a Cypriot lawyer who has been described as an activist and as a politician. His activism work primarily concerned the rights and well-being of refugees, and opposition to the austerity policies of the Cypriot government. He was an independent candidate for the European Parliament.

Early life and education 
Michalis Paraskevas was born and raised in Nicosia to a Greek-Cypriot family. He has been influenced by his family and his social environment and he was raised to be proud of his Greek heritage and the national struggles, but he never was a nationalist or right-wing. He studied law at Aristotle University of Thessaloniki in Greece.

Activism 
In 2014, he refused to pay social insurance contributions as an act of civil disobedience in response to the government's decision of writing-off a 7.2 billion euro debt to the Social Insurance Fund, as suggested by the Troika in 2012. A refusal to comply with the court order to pay the fine could result in a jail sentence and probably disbarment. Michalis Paraskevas' civil disobedience was also connected to the refusal of the Minister of Finance to comply with the Social Insurance Fund 2010 Law, which obliged the Minister to repay some of the debt back to the Social Insurance account so as to create real assets, and to appoint an independent committee for auditing purposes. The initiative concerning the Social Insurance Fund resulted in the creation of a small team of activists called "Initiative for Social Control of Social Insurance Fund". It demanded the return of money from the state to the Social Insurance Fund, and reformation of the way the Fund is controlled so as to allow for some direct control by the citizens. As he explained in interviews following the 2018 Presidential Election, when the same people were candidates, as if nothing happened, he realized that the impact of this endearing effort simply had no practical effect on society and that the civil disobedience as way of social struggle or awaking in Cyprus society was at least insufficient. ΕΥΡΩΕΚΛΟΓΕΣ 2019-ΜΙΧΑΛΗΣ ΠΑΡΑΣΚΕΥΑΣ Active Radio Cyprus on Facebook Watch

Ideas, influences, and political stances 
Michalis Paraskevas has consistently defended human rights and social equality.

He identified himself as an anarchist who supports direct democracy, and named Peter Kropotkin, Mikhail Bekunin, Errico Malatesta and Alexander Berkman as his influences. At some point, he vehemently opposed voting and all contact with political parties, and argued that anyone running for office does it for personal gain, and also argued against the hypocrisy of tie-wearing politicians.

He later switched position and lobbied parliamentary parties in order to influence the legislative process.

A quote from one of his interviews: 

In December 2018, he announced his candidacy for the European Parliament Elections of May 2019 and started wearing a tie on TV. He also claimed that his political views and aspirations partly overlap with two parties, the Cyprus Green Party and the Citizens' Alliance.

On 14 January 2019 he announced that he would be running for office as an independent candidate. In justifying his decision, he stated that society wants others to decide. He also stated that his personal long-term goal is to participate in decisions.

He has a distinctive style and mannerisms, characterised by "fiery posturing", furious and energetic "as if about to explode".

References

1976 births
Living people
Cypriot activists
Anti-austerity protests in the European Union
Cypriot politicians